The University of Bakhtalruda is a university in the town of Ed Dueim in Sudan, on the White Nile, between Khartoum and Kosti.  Bakhtalruda University was established under a constitutional decree issued by the Presidency of the Republic of Sudan on 2 Shawal 1417AH, or 1 1997. 
It is a public university.
Bakhtalruda University is a member of the Federation of the Universities of the Islamic World.
As of September 2011, the university was a member in good standing of the Association of African Universities.

References

Faculties
The university has Five (5) faculties.

Faculty of Medicine

Faculty of Education

Faculty of Science

Faculty of Languages

Faculty of Law

Universities and colleges in Sudan
Buildings and structures in Khartoum
Educational institutions established in 1990
1990 establishments in Sudan